Qotbabad (also Romanized as Qoţbābād-Bnd; also known as Ghotb Abad, Kuhawad, Kūrwād, Kūrwēd, Kutawad, Qoţbābād, Qoţbābād-Bnd, and Qoţbābād-Bnd) is a village in Gohreh Rural District, Fin District, Bandar Abbas County, Hormozgan Province, Iran. At the 2006 census, its population was 694, in 187 families.

References 

Populated places in Bandar Abbas County